Jirsar Bagher Khaleh (also Romanized as Jirsar Bagher Khaleh; also known as Jir-e-Sar) is a village in Chukam Rural District, Khomam District, Rasht County, Gilan Province, Iran. At the 2006 census, its population was 905, in 223 families.

References 

Populated places in Rasht County